Chippewa Valley Schools is a school district with its headquarters located in Clinton Township, Macomb County, Michigan. The district encompasses over 27 square miles, partially serving students of the Clinton Township and Macomb Township along with other nearby districts. It served 16,226 students during the 2016-2017 school year, making it the 6th-largest school district by enrollment in the state. The school district was formed in 1959 through the consolidation of six existing school districts.

Schools
Chippewa Valley Schools operates 20 schools, including three high schools, four middle schools, twelve elementary schools and one preschool. The district also contains the International Academy of Macomb, which offers the International Baccalaureate program for qualifying students in Macomb County. Adult education is offered at Mohegan High School.

The two main high schools—Chippewa Valley and Dakota—have designated ninth grade centers, which are buildings only occupied by freshmen.

Virtually all of the district's schools are named after Native American tribes or people, in which some have been criticized, including Chippewa Valley High School and 34 other high schools in Michigan for their use of Native American symbols in their mascots and nicknames.

Preschool
Little Turtle Center has a maximum capacity of 283 children. It doesn't participate in a subsidized child care program.

Elementary

Cherokee Elementary School
Cheyenne Elementary School
Clinton Valley Elementary School
Erie Elementary School
Fox Elementary School
Huron Elementary School
Miami Elementary School
Mohawk Elementary School
Ojibwa Elementary School
Ottawa Elementary School
Sequoyah Elementary School
Shawnee Elementary School

Middle
 Algonquin Middle School
 Iroquois Middle School
 Seneca Middle School
 Wyandot Middle School

High
 Chippewa Valley High School
 Dakota High School
 Mohegan High School

See also

List of school districts in Michigan

References

External links

School districts in Michigan
Education in Macomb County, Michigan
School districts established in 1959
1959 establishments in Michigan